Prof Hyman Levy  (28 February 1889 – 27 February 1975) was a Scottish-Jewish philosopher, Emeritus Professor of Imperial College London, mathematician, political activist and fellow of the Royal Society of Edinburgh.

Life
The son of Minna Cohen and Marcus Levy, a picture-framer and occasional art dealer in Edinburgh, Hyman was the third oldest of eight children. They lived at 70 Bristo Street in Edinburgh's South Side.

He went to school at George Heriot's School a short distance from his family home, and was the School Dux. He then studied mathematics at Edinburgh University. Having declined the opportunity to study at Cambridge University on account of its complicity in Britain's class system, he instead chose to conduct further research at the University of Göttingen in Germany. At the outbreak of World War I he returned to Britain. In 1916 he joined the Royal Flying Corps. It is unclear if he saw active service but it inspired an interest in aerodynamics.

Researching aeronautics at the National Physical Laboratory, Levy published papers and books on mathematical applications pertaining to the subject. He also wrote about differential equations and probability. After leaving the Laboratory, he became a professor of mathematics at the Royal College of Science, Imperial College London, where he later served as head of the mathematics department. In recognition of his contribution he subsequently became dean of the Royal College itself.

In 1916 he was elected a Fellow of the Royal Society of Edinburgh. His proposers were Cargill Gilston Knott, Edmund Taylor Whittaker, James Robert Milne and George Alexander Carse.

In 1918, he married Marion Aitken Fraser, despite the disapproval of his family. They had three children. Levy was in the Labour Party from 1920 to 1931, and then in 1931 he joined the Communist Party of Great Britain. Despite his theoretical allegiance to the principles of communism, Levy became disappointed by the way the Russian communists treated Jews, and published on the topic, leading to his expulsion from the party in 1958.

He died in Wimbledon, London on 27 February 1975.

Following Levy's paper "On Goldbach's Conjecture" from 1963, Lemoine's conjecture is incorrectly referred to by MathWorld as "Levy's conjecture."

Publications
 Finite Difference Equations, co-authored with F. Lessman; Pitman (Dec 1959), .
 Aeronautics in Theory and Experiment, co-authored with William Lewis Cowley; ASIN: B000WUT77A; republished by BiblioBazaar; .
 Jews and the National Question, Hillway Pub. Co., London; 1st Edition (1958); ASIN: B0007J87TA.
 Aspects of Dialectical Materialism, co-authored with Ralph Fox. John MacMurray et al.; Watts (1935), London; ASIN: B0037ZPVHC.
 Literature for an age of science, Methuen (1952); ASIN: B0000CIEER.
 Social Thinking, Cobbett (1945); ASIN: B0014KNTQW.
 Elementary Statistics (Nelson's Aeroscience Manuals), Nelson (1945); ASIN: B001P8HX9C.
 Elementary Statistics (Nelson's Aeroscience Manuals), Thomas Nelson (1945); ASIN: B00978213K.
 Soviet Jews at war, pamphlet, Russia Today Society (1943); ASIN: B00KBTLNDI.
 Science: Curse Or Blessing?, Watts & Co. (1940); ASIN: B0026OCT8O.
 Elementary Mathematics, Thomas Nelson & Sons (1942); ASIN: B0007DT7RC.
 Modern Science – A Study of Physical Science in the World Today, Hamish Hamilton (1939); ASIN: B00085G0RO.
 Elementary Statistics, Nelson (1959), London; ASIN: B000OUHSRO.
 A Philosophy for a Modern Man; Alfred A. Knopf (1938); ASIN: B0006DA3US.
 Modern Engineering Theory & Practice, co-authored with Bailey Levy; Odhams Press Ltd (1935); ASIN: B000R7AJPW.
 Practical Mathematical Analysis ... With examples by the translator, co-authored with Horst von Sanden; ASIN: B0017WK6S6.
 The Universe of Science; republished by Rupa and Co, New Delhi; .

See also
Dorothy Galton

Notes

References

Further reading
 G A Barnard, Hyman Levy, Dictionary of National Biography, 1971–1980 (Oxford-New York, 1986), 503–504.

1889 births
1975 deaths
Philosophers from Edinburgh
People educated at George Heriot's School
Alumni of the University of Edinburgh
Communist Party of Great Britain members
University of Göttingen alumni
Academics of Imperial College London
Scottish communists
Scottish Jews
Scottish mathematicians
Scottish political writers
Jewish philosophers
Jewish socialists
Fellows of the Royal Society of Edinburgh
British Army personnel of World War I
Deans of the Royal College of Science
20th-century British philosophers